Fernande Tassy (1903 – 1952) was a French fencer. She competed in the individual women's foil competition at the 1924 Summer Olympics.

References

External links
 

1903 births
1952 deaths
French female foil fencers
Olympic fencers of France
Fencers at the 1924 Summer Olympics
20th-century French women